The 29th National Assembly of Quebec was the provincial legislature in Quebec, Canada that was elected in the 1970 Quebec general election.  It sat for four sessions, from 9 June 1970 to 19 December 1970; from 23 February 1971 to 24 December 1971; from 7 March 1972 to 14 March 1973; and from 15 March 1973 to 25 September 1973. The governing Quebec Liberal Party was led by Premier Robert Bourassa; the official opposition Union Nationale was led by Jean-Jacques Bertrand and later by Gabriel Loubier. The events of the October Crisis took place during this mandate.

Seats per political party

 After the 1970 elections

Member list

This was the list of members of the National Assembly of Quebec that were elected in the 1970 election:

Other elected MNAs

Other MNAs were elected during this mandate in by-elections

 Jean Cournoyer, Quebec Liberal Party, Chambly, February 8, 1971 
 Donald Gallienne, Quebec Liberal Party, Duplessis, October 11, 1972 
 Michel Gratton, Quebec Liberal Party, Gatineau, November 15, 1972

Cabinet Ministers

 Prime Minister and Executive Council President: Robert Bourassa
 Deputy Premier: Gérard D. Levesque
 Agriculture and Colonization: Normand Toupin
 Labour and Workforce: Pierre Laporte (1970), Jean Cournoyer (1970–1973)
 Public Works: Maurice Tessier (1970, 1973), Bernard Pinard (1970–1973)
 Public Works and Provisioning: Maurice Tessier (1973)
 Public Office: Raymond Garneau (1970), Jean-Paul L'Allier (1970–1972), Jean Cournoyer (1972–1973), Oswald Parent (1973)
 Cultural Affairs: François Cloutier (1970–1972), Marie-Claire Kirkland (1972–1973)
 Immigration: Pierre Laporte (1970), François Cloutier (1970–1972), Jean Bienvenue (1972–1973)
 Health, Family and Social Welfare: Claude Castonguay (1970)
 Social Affairs: Claude Castonguay (1970–1973)
 Education: Guy Saint-Pierre (1970–1972), François Cloutier (1972–1973)
 Lands and Forests: Thomas Kevin Drummond
 Tourism, Hunting and Fishing: Marie-Claire Kirkland (1970–1972), Guy Saint-Pierre (1972), Claude Simard (1972–1973)
 Natural Resources: Jean-Gilles Massé
 Roads: Bernard Pinard (1970–1973)
 Transportation: Georges-Emery Tremblay (1970–1971), Bernard Pinard (1971–1973)
 Communications: Jean-Paul L'Allier
 Municipal Affairs: Maurice Tessier (1970–1973), Victor Goldbloom (1973)
 Intergovernmental Affairs: Gérard D. Levesque (1970–1971, 1972–1973), Robert Bourassa (1971–1972)
 Industry and Commerce:Gérard D. Levesque (1970–1972), Guy Saint-Pierre (1972–1973)
 Financial Institutions, Companies and Cooperatives: Jérôme Choquette (1970), William Tetley (1970–1973)
 Justice: Jérôme Choquette
 Solicitor General: Roy Fournier (1971–1972)
 Finances: Robert Bourassa (1970), Raymond Garneau (1970–1973)
 President of the Treasury Board: Raymond Garneau (1971–1973)
 Revenu: William Tetley (1970), Gérald Harvey (1970–1973)
 State Ministers: Oswald Parent (1970–1973), Raymond Mailloux (1972–1973), Georges-Emery Tremblay (1971–1973), Claude Simard (1970–1972), Victor Goldbloom (1970–1973), Gérald Harvey (1970), Paul Phaneuf (1973), Robert Quenneville, Roy Fournier (1970–1971), Jean Bienvenue (1971–1972)

New electoral districts

A major electoral reform took place in 1972 in which several ridings were merged or split. The changes were effective for the 1973 elections.

 Anjou was created from parts of LaFontaine
 Dorchester was renamed Beauce-Nord
 Beauce was renamed Beauce-Sud
 Brome and Missiquoi were merged to form Brome-Missisquoi.
 Charlesbourg was created from parts of Chauveau.
 Ahuntsic was renamed Crémazie.
 The old Frontenac riding was split. A new, unrelated Frontenac was created from the renaming and partial merger of Mégantic.
 Gaspé, which had been previously split into Gaspé-Nord and Gaspé-Sud, returned as a reunited single riding.
 Bagot was renamed Johnson
 Joliette and Montcalm merged to form Joliette-Montcalm
 L'Acadie was created from parts of Saint-Laurent and Ahuntsic.
 Kamouraska and Témiscouata were merged to form Kamouraska-Témiscouata.
 Montmagny and L'Islet were merged to form Montmagny-L'Islet.
 Parts of Mégantic and all of Compton were merged to form Mégantic-Compton.
 Napierville-Laprairie was renamed La Prairie.
 Mille-Iles was created from parts of Fabre.
 Mont-Royal was created from parts of Outremont.
 Nicolet and Yamaska were merged to form Nicolet-Yamaska.
 Pointe-Claire was formed from parts of Jacques-Cartier and Robert-Baldwin.
 Prévost was created from parts of Terrebonne.
 Rosemont was created from parts of Jeanne-Mance.
 Sauvé was created from parts of Bourassa.
 Taschereau was created from parts of Jean-Talon.
 Labelle was renamed Laurentides-Labelle.
 Laporte was formed from parts of Taillon

References
 1970 election results
 List of Historical Cabinet Ministers

Notes

29